Civil Aid Voluntary Rescue Association (CAVRA) is a voluntary search and rescue organisation operating within the South Wales area from mid to the south Wales coast]. It is a registered charity, and its purpose is to provide back-up personnel to the official emergency services in a range of situations, including in particular searches for missing persons. They also provide support at public events and during times of adverse weather conditions, natural disaster or civil emergency.

References

External links
 Civil Aid Voluntary Rescue Organisation

Volunteer search and rescue in the United Kingdom